Daunorubicin/cytarabine is a fixed-dose combination medication used for the treatment of acute myeloid leukemia. It contains the liposomal bound daunorubicin, an anthracycline topoisomerase inhibitor, and cytarabine, a nucleoside metabolic inhibitor.

Medical uses 
Daunorubicin/cytarabine is indicated for the treatment of newly-diagnosed therapy-related acute myeloid leukemia (t-AML) or AML with myelodysplasia-related changes (AML-MRC) in people aged one year of age and older.

References

External links 
 

Antineoplastic drugs
Combination drugs